Jeffrey Allen Baldwin (born September 5, 1965) is a former Major League Baseball player. Baldwin played in seven games for the Houston Astros in the 1990 season. He had no hits in eight at-bats, in seven games. He also had one walk.

He was drafted by the Astros in the 14th round of the 1985 amateur draft.

External links

1965 births
Living people
Major League Baseball outfielders
Baseball players from Delaware
Houston Astros players
Jackson Generals (Texas League) players
Iowa Cubs players
Osceola Astros players
Columbus Astros players
Charlotte Knights players
Asheville Tourists players
Gulf Coast Astros players
Columbus Mudcats players
People from Milford, Delaware